"A Question of Lust" is a song by English electronic music band Depeche Mode from their fifth studio album, Black Celebration (1986). It was released on 14 April 1986 as the album's second single.

It is the second Depeche Mode single with Martin Gore on lead vocals, following "Somebody", and the first to be released in its own right. However, the 12" single was released as a double A-side with "A Question of Time" in the United States, like "Somebody".

The single reached number 28 in United Kingdom and number eight in West Germany.

B-sides
The B-side is an instrumental called "Christmas Island", named after the island of the same name. It is penned by both Martin Gore and Alan Wilder and was produced by Depeche Mode themselves. The song was featured in the end credits for the second episode of the Disney+ series, Hawkeye.

The live tracks available on some versions of the single are taken from a 1984 concert in Basel, Switzerland.

Music video
The music video for "A Question of Lust" features the return of director Clive Richardson for his last video with the band. It also became the last music video the band filmed before the arrival of Dutch director Anton Corbijn, who, since August 1986, became a regular collaborator for the band until the mid-2010s.

Track listings
All songs written by Martin L. Gore, except "Christmas Island" written by Gore and Alan Wilder and "If You Want" written by Wilder.

7" single: Mute / 7Bong11 (UK)
 "A Question of Lust" – 4:29
 "Christmas Island" – 4:51

 The single version is basically the album version but without the cross-fade from the previous track ("Fly on the Windscreen").
12" single: Mute / 12Bong11 (UK)
 "A Question of Lust" – 4:29
 "Christmas Island (Extended)" – 5:37
 "People are People (Live)" – 4:21
 "It Doesn't Matter Two (Instrumental)" – 2:49
 "A Question of Lust (Minimal)" – 6:49

 Released on CD in Germany by Intercord: INT 826.841 (1986)
Cassette single: Mute / CBong11 (UK)
 "A Question of Lust (Flood Mix)" – 5:07 [*]
 "Christmas Island" – 4:51
 "If You Want (Live)" – 5:16
 "Shame (Live)" – 4:13
 "Blasphemous Rumours (Live)" – 5:25

 This format came in a 7" card envelope with an insert and a badge.
 Released on 12" in Germany by Intercord: INT 126.844 (L12Bong11) (1986). This was the only vinyl release of the UK Mute CBONG11 cassette
 Released on CD in France by Virgin: 30167 (1986). This was the only, very rare CD release of the CBONG11 cassette.
 Alan Wilder is quoted as saying that when Flood eventually delivered his remix of "A Question of Lust", the band were surprised to hear that half of the sounds had been omitted. They were understandably annoyed therefore when it emerged that Mute Records had not actually sent him both the multi-track tapes.
CD single: Mute / CDBong11 (UK)
 "A Question of Lust" – 4:29
 "Christmas Island" – 4:51
 "Christmas Island (Extended)" – 5:37
 "People Are People (Live)" – 4:21
 "It Doesn't Matter Two (Instrumental)" – 2:49
 "A Question of Lust (Minimal)" – 6:49

 The CD single was released in 1991 as part of the singles box set compilations
7" single: Sire / 7-28697-DJ (US)
 "A Question of Lust (Robert Margouleff Remix)" – 3:45
 "A Question of Lust" [Edit] – 4:14 [*]

 The Edit version of "A Question of Lust" on the US commercial 7" single is not actually labelled as such. The only difference between the "Edit" and the normal single version is that it is faded about 20 seconds earlier.
12" single: Sire / 0-20530 (US)
 "A Question of Lust (Minimal)" – 6:49
 "Black Celebration (Live)" – 6:05
 "A Question of Time (Extended Remix)" – 6:38
 "Something to Do (Live)" – 3:50

 "A Question of Lust (Minimal)" is titled "A Question of Lust (Extended Version)"
 Double A-side with "A Question of Time"

Charts

Weekly charts

Year-end charts

References

External links
 Single information from the official Depeche Mode website
 AllMusic review

1986 singles
1986 songs
Depeche Mode songs
Mute Records singles
Songs written by Martin Gore
Song recordings produced by Daniel Miller
Song recordings produced by Gareth Jones
UK Independent Singles Chart number-one singles